This is a list of members of the Victorian Legislative Assembly, from the 1902 state election held on 1 October 1902 to the 1904 state election held on 1 June 1904. From 1889 there were 95 seats in the Assembly.

Victoria became a state of Australia in 1901. At the 1904 elections, 42 districts were abolished and new ones created. The abolished districts were: Anglesey; Ararat; Benalla and Yarrawonga; Bogong; Carlton South; Castlemaine; Clunes and Allandale; Creswick; Dandenong and Berwick; Delatite; Donald and Swan Hill; Dunolly; East Bourke; East Bourke Boroughs; Eastern Suburbs; Emerald Hill; Essendon and Flemington; Footscray; Gippsland Central; Grant; Horsham; Jolimont and West Richmond; Kilmore, Dalhousie and Lancefield; Kyneton; Maldon; Mandurang; Melbourne South; Normanby; Numurkah and Nathalia; Portland; Ripon and Hampden; Sandhurst; Sandhurst South; Shepparton and Euroa; South Yarra; Stawell; Talbot and Avoca; Villiers and Heytesbury; Wangaratta and Rutherglen; West Bourke; West Melbourne and Windermere.

Note: the Start and End dates refer to the politician's term for that seat. 

Duncan Gillies was Speaker until his death on 12 September 1903. William Beazley was Chairman of Committees until becoming Speaker on 16 September 1903.

 Gillies died 12 September 1903; replaced by George Fairbairn in October 1903
 Hall died 25 April 1903; replaced by John Carlisle in May 1903.
 Hickford resigned in November 1903; replaced by David Methven in December 1903.
 Hirsch resigned in November 1903; replaced by William Telford Webb in December 1903.
 McKenzie left Parliament in February 1903; replaced by Thomas Hunt in March 1903. 
 Maloney resigned in November 1903; replaced by Tom Tunnecliffe in December 1903.
 Staughton died 20 May 1903; replaced by Andrew Robert Robertson in June 1903.
 Trenwith resigned in November 1903;  replaced by George Roberts in December 1903.
 Wilson resigned in November 1903; replaced by John Glasgow in December 1903.

References

Members of the Parliament of Victoria by term
20th-century Australian politicians